Lu County or Luxian is a county in the southeast of Sichuan Province, China, bordering Chongqing Municipality to the northeast. It is the northernmost county-level division of Luzhou city.

History
Lu County has a history over 2100 years. The county, known anciently as Jiangyang, was established in 135 BC during the Han Dynasty.

Geography

Population
As of 2006 the county had a population of 1,055,200.

Transport
China National Highway 321

Climate

See also
Luzhou

References

External links
  Luxian Government website

 
County-level divisions of Sichuan
Luzhou